Bogarmang
 Valley is a little-known valley situated in Mansehra District, Khyber-Pakhtunkhwa, Pakistan. Like the neighboring areas, this valley also suffered greatly from the earthquake which hit the region on October 8, 2005.

Etymology of the name
The valley gets its name from the River Bogarmang which flows through it. The valley was earlier known as Dara Bogarmang getting its name from village Bogarmang centrally situated in the valley. The literacy rate of Bogarmang valley is 91.5%.

Geography
The Siran River originates from the Mandagucha Glacier and merges into the Tarbela lake. The Siran issues by the glaciers of glorious mountains and flows through the western plain of Pakhli. Two canals have been taken out from the Siran River, the upper Siran canal at Dharial and lower Siran canal at Shinkiari. From Pakhli the Siran runs into the Tanawal hills and joins the Indus at Tarbela in the northwest. Its total course is between 70 miles and 80 miles, and it irrigates 6,273 acres of land.

Tourism 
Bogarmang valley is considered one of the "most beautiful valley" of Pakistan. With the peaks like Musa ka Musallah and Chukro peaks, meadows like Baleja, Saraan, Khandagali, Aram gali, Darwaza gali, Chor and Mundi and forest like Jacha, Mandagucha, Dhor, Kundbangla and Sathan Gali, Siran valley is full of scenic landmarks.

See also
Musa ka Musala
Kaghan Valley

References

Mansehra District
Valleys of Khyber Pakhtunkhwa